Buļļu Sala (also known as Daugavgrīvas Sala) is an island in the Kurzeme District of Riga, Latvia.

See also
List of islands of Latvia
Beach on the north coast of the island

References

Islands in Riga